Beni walks on his own is a 1975 Albanian comedy family film directed by Xhanfize Keko and written by Kiço Blushi.

Summary
Beni is an eight-year-old boy living in Korçë with his parents. Beni leads a sheltered life. His mother is very protective and doesn't let him play outside. When Beni is able to go outside, the neighborhood children make fun of him, often calling him a "scaredy cat" and a "mama's boy." One day when his uncle Thomai is visiting, he sees Beni crying after the other children took his horse. Thomai decides to take Beni on horseback to a distant village where he teaches him about life and how to be a man. In the village Beni learns a great deal and blossoms into a mature boy. On the way back to the city Beni doesn't need to ride on horseback, he is able to walk all the way home on his own.

Cast
Yllka Mujo as Leta
Pandi Raidhi as Thomai
Dhorkë Orgocka as Ollga
Herion Mustafaraj as Beni
Gjergj Sollaku as Goni
Koço Guda as Vaso
Ema Shteto as Drita

External links
 

Albanian comedy films
1975 films
1975 comedy films
Albanian-language films
Films directed by Xhanfise Keko